Basse-Aboujagane is a Canadian community, located in Westmorland County, New Brunswick, part of the incorporated rural community of Beaubassin East. The community is situated in southeastern New Brunswick, to the East of Moncton. Basse-Aboujagane is located mainly on Route 933.

History
Basse-Aboujagane was first settled about 1810 by Acadians from Memramcook and Fox Creek. In 1871 "Bougogen" had a population of 100. By 1898, Basse-Aboujagane was a farming and fishing settlement with 1 post office, 2 lobster factories and a population of 200 people.

Notable people

See also
List of communities in New Brunswick

Bordering communities

Cormier Village, New Brunswick
Bourgeois Village, New Brunswick
Drisdelle, New Brunswick

References

Communities in Westmorland County, New Brunswick
Settlements in New Brunswick